Relations between Kazakhstan and Tajikistan began on 7 January 1993. Both counties are members of the Commonwealth of Independent States. Kazakhstan maintains an embassy in Dushanbe. The current Tajikistan ambassador to Kazakhstan is Akbarsho Iskandrov.

Bilateral agreements

Kazakh Export Chairman Aslan Kaligazin signed bilateral agreements with the major banks of Tajikistan for cooperation and to increase the exports of non-commodity goods from Kazakhstan.

High-level mutual state visits

See also
Foreign relations of Kazakhstan
Foreign relations of Tajikistan

References 

 
Tajikistan
Bilateral relations of Tajikistan